Helgøya Church is a parish church of the Church of Norway in Ringsaker Municipality in Innlandet county, Norway. It is located on the island of Helgøya. It is one of the churches for the Nes parish which is part of the Ringsaker prosti (deanery) in the Diocese of Hamar. The white, wooden church was built in a long church design in 1870 using plans drawn up by the architect Jacob Wilhelm Nordan. The church seats about 200 people.

History
In the 1850s, plans were made for a new church on the island of Helgøya. The new church would be an annex to the Nes Church parish.In 1868, permission was granted to build the new church on the Svennerud farm. Of two competing drawings, the parish chose the design by Jacob Wilhelm Nordan. The lead builder was Ole Stensrud from Vang. The new church was to be a half-timbered long church in the Swiss chalet style with about 200 seats. The new building was consecrated on 7 December 1870.

Media gallery

See also
List of churches in Hamar

References

Churches in Ringsaker
Churches in Innlandet
Long churches in Norway
Wooden churches in Norway
19th-century Church of Norway church buildings
Churches completed in 1870
1870 establishments in Norway